Charles Henry Stokes (Dublin, 1852 – near the Lindi River (Congo), 1895) was an Irish missionary turned trader who lived much of his life in Africa and was the centre of the Stokes Affair between the United Kingdom and Congo Free State.

Life
Charles was born in Dublin and went to school in Enniskillen before his father died when Charles was twenty. When this happened, he went with his mother to Liverpool, where he found work as a clerk for the Church Missionary Society. He decided to seek new horizons and trained as a lay evangelist with the Society in Reading. In May 1878 he arrived in Zanzibar. His first act was to set up a 300-strong vehicle caravan to the Great Lakes, because he wanted to Christianise Buganda. He was a skilled organizer and increasingly undertook expeditions.

In January 1883 he married in the Cathedral of Zanzibar with Ellen Sherratt, one of the nurses who were sent to him by the mission. She gave birth to their daughter Ellen Louise in March 1884, but died a week later. The following year Stokes married again, to an African woman named Limi relative of the chief of the Wanyamwesi, a tribe that supplied many of the bearers in his caravans. This was highly unusual at the time. He also had two African concubines, Nanjala and Zaria, with whom he had two children. He was excommunicated by the Protestant Church and became a trader around central Africa, selling goods such as ivory.

Stokes was on good terms with the Arabo-Swahili and the British, and since 1890 with the Germans, trading with all of them. In 1894 he went for the first time with a large expedition to north-eastern Congo, with thousands of carriers and large quantities of guns and ivory. The Arabo-Swahili who he was trading with were at war with the Congo Free State at the time and desperately needed weapons.

Arrest, trial, execution
Through intercepted letters, Captain Hubert-Joseph Lothaire, the commander of the Belgian forces in the region, learned that Stokes was coming to the Congo to trade weapons. He sent Lieutenant Josué Henry with 70 men ahead to capture him. Henry took advantage of the absence of a large part of Stokes' caravan, who were scattered in the forest searching for food, and arrested him in his tent (December 1894). He was taken to Lothaire in Lindi, who immediately formed a Drumhead court-martial. Stokes was found guilty of selling guns, gunpowder and detonators to the Belgians' Afro-Arab enemies (Kilonga Longa, Said Abedi and Kibonge). He was sentenced to death and was hanged the next day (hoisted on a tree).

The procedure is said to have had many irregularities, including false statements. There was no penal code, no clerk, the verdict was not read, and Stokes did not appeal, although as a citizen he was entitled to.

Aftermath
In August 1895, the press began to report in detail on this case, including in the Pall Mall Gazette by journalist Lionel Decle. As a result, the case became an international incident, better known as the Stokes Affair. Together, Britain and Germany pressured Belgium to put Lothaire on trial, which they did, in Boma. The Free State paid compensation to the British (150,000 francs) and Germans (100,000 francs) and made it impossible by decree martial or death sentences against Europeans. Stokes's body was returned to his family.

In April 1896 the court of Boma acquitted Lothaire after a short trial, in what is considered a questionable verdict. The appeal was confirmed by the Supreme Court of Congo in Brussels in August 1896, paving the way for the rehabilitation of Lothaire.

The Stokes Affair mobilized British public opinion against the Congo Free State. It also damaged the reputation of King Leopold II of Belgium as a benevolent despot, which he had cultivated with so much effort. The case helped encourage the foundation of the Congo Reform Association and the annexation of the Congo by the Belgian state in 1908.

See also
 Stokes Affair

Further reading
 Raymond Moloney, "Charles Stokes (1852-1895): An Irishman in 19th Century Africa", in: Studies: An Irish Quarterly Review, vol. 87, 1998, no. 346, pp. 128–134
 Robert Asketill 'Buganda History Part 39: The hanging of Charles Henry Stokes' in: The London Evening Post accessed on April 3, 2017
 1895: Charles Stokes, in the heart of darkness

References

Businesspeople from Dublin (city)
1852 births
1895 deaths
Irish Anglican missionaries
Anglican missionaries in Tanzania
People executed by hanging
People executed by Belgium
Irish people executed abroad